Tierra Nueva is a town and municipality in the state of San Luis Potosí in central Mexico. It has close to 5,000 inhabitants and is at 1,780 meters above sea level.

References

Municipalities of San Luis Potosí